Moses Kpakor (born 6 January 1965) is a retired football midfielder who played for Nigeria at the 1990 African Cup of Nations in Algeria.

Career
Born in Benué State, Kpakor began playing club football as a defensive midfielder for local side Hawks of Makurdi. He would play in the Nigerian Premier League with Electricity FC, BCC Lions FC and Abiola Babes during an 18-year career. He won the Nigerian FA Cup twice (with Abiola Babes in 1987 and with BCC Lions in 1989) and the African Cup Winners' Cup (with BCC Lions in 1990).

Kpakor made several appearances for the Nigeria senior national team, including a 1994 FIFA World Cup qualifier. He played in every match at the 1990 African Cup of Nations, helping Nigeria to a runners'-up finish.

After he retired from playing, Kpakor became a football coach. He managed his former club, BCC Lions.

Personal
Kpakor's son, Kelvin, is also a professional footballer.

References

External links

1965 births
Living people
Nigerian footballers
Nigeria international footballers
1990 African Cup of Nations players
Lobi Stars F.C. players
Nigerian football managers
Lobi Stars F.C. managers
BCC Lions F.C. players
Association football midfielders
Abiola Babes F.C. players